Rochelle Nguyen is an American politician and attorney serving as a member of the Nevada Senate, representing the 3rd district. She previously served in the Nevada Assembly representing the 10th district, which includes a portion of Las Vegas.

Early life and education 
Nguyen was born in 1977 in Vancouver, Washington. She earned a Bachelor of Arts from the University of Puget Sound and a Juris Doctor from the William S. Boyd School of Law at the University of Nevada, Las Vegas.

Career 
After graduating from law school, Nguyen became a member of the State Bar of Nevada. She worked for three years in the Clark County Public Defender's Office before establishing her own criminal defense practice. In December 2018, Nguyen was appointed to the Nevada Assembly to fill the seat left vacant by Chris Brooks. Four years later she was appointed to replace Brooks after his resignation from the Nevada Senate.

References 

Women state legislators in Nevada
Democratic Party members of the Nevada Assembly
American women of Vietnamese descent in politics
William S. Boyd School of Law alumni
University of Puget Sound alumni
Politicians from Vancouver, Washington
1977 births
Living people
21st-century American politicians
21st-century American women politicians